Wang Yao may refer to:

Xia Jia, real name Wang Yao, Chinese novelist
Yao Wang, Chinese-American video engineer